Mary Grant may refer to:
Mary Grant Price (1917–2002), American costume designer
Mary Grant (politician) (1928–2016), Ghanaian politician
Mary Grant (sculptor) (1831–1908), British sculptor
Mary K. Grant (1902-1975) American industrial designer
Mary E. Grant (born 1953), American psychiatric nurse and politician
Mary Pollock Grant (1876–1957), Scottish suffragette, politician, missionary and policewoman
Mary Grant (archer), Canadian archer
Maria Rosetti (1819–1893), née Marie Grant, Guernsey born Wallachian and Romanian political activist, journalist, essayist, philanthropist and socialite
Mary Seacole (1805–1881), née Mary Grant, Jamaican-born woman of Scottish and Creole descent who set up a 'British Hotel' behind the lines during the Crimean War
Liz Grant (Mary Elizabeth Grant, born 1930), former Australian pharmacist and politician
Mary Grant in Jules Verne novel In Search of the Castaways

See also
Mary Grant Bruce (1878–1958), Australian children's author and journalist
Mary Grant Carmichael (1851–1935), English composer